These are the results of the Men's 4 x 400 metres relay event at the 1997 World Championships in Athletics in Athens, Greece.

The gold medal was originally won by the US team, but the team were retrospectively disqualified in 2009 after Antonio Pettigrew admitted to using human growth hormone and EPO between 1997 and 2003.

Medalists

* Runners who participated in the heats only and received medals.

Results

Heats

Qualification: First 2 of each heat (Q) plus the 2 fastest times (q) advance to the final.

Final

References
 Results
 IAAF

- Mens 4x400 Metres Relay
Relays at the World Athletics Championships